The Standing Committee of European Doctors (CPME) represents national medical associations across Europe.

It promotes the highest standards of medical training and medical practice in order to achieve the highest quality of health care for all patients in Europe. CPME strongly advocates a “health in all policies” approach to encourage cross-sectorial awareness for and action on the social determinants of health, since a healthy economy depends on a healthy population. To achieve its goals, CPME co-operates proactively with the institutions of the European Union.

Policies are set both in answer to developments in Europe, as well as by taking the lead in matters regarding the medical profession and patient care. CPME offers broad expertise in matters relating to medicine and the medical profession and is directed by a Board, which is elected by the General Assembly every three years.

Governance 
The bodies of the Standing Committee are:
 the General Assembly
 the Board
 the Executive Committee
 an auditor

The CPME Secretariat is situated in Brussels, Belgium.

Finance 
The Standing Committee of European Doctors (CPME) is an AISBL registered under Belgian law. Its financial income is based on members’ contributions. CPME may be involved in European projects and tenders, resulting in additional funding by EU institutions. CPME does not receive financial support from industry sources.

CPME has been registered in the joint Transparency Register of the European Parliament and of the European Commission since September 2008, with an Identification number of 9276943405-41.

Policy areas 
CPME is active in several policy areas:

 Professional practice and patients' rights 
 Public health and disease prevention
 eHealth
 Pharmaceuticals and healthcare products
 EU political outlook

Members 
The Standing Committee of European Doctors (CPME) represents national medical associations from the following countries:

Members 
Austria, Belgium, Bulgaria, Croatia, Cyprus, Czech Republic, Denmark, Estonia, Finland, Germany, Greece, Hungary, Iceland, Ireland, Latvia, Lithuania, Luxembourg, Malta, Norway, Poland, Portugal, Romania, Slovakia, Slovenia, Sweden, Switzerland, The Netherlands, United Kingdom

Associated Members 
Turkey, Ukraine

Associated organisation 
EMSA, EUMASS, WMA, MWIA, WMA

Observers 
Albania, Georgia, Israel, Kosovo, Serbia

References

External links 
  

European medical and health organizations
Higher education organisations based in Europe
European Doctors